Ulkuthu is a 2017 Tamil-language action comedy drama film directed by Caarthick Raju and produced by J. Selva Kumar, featuring Dinesh and Nandita Swetha in the leading roles. The project was first announced in late 2014 and finished production in September 2016.

Cast

 Dinesh as Raja
 Nandita Swetha as Kadalarasi
 Bala Saravanan as Sura Shankar 
 Sharath Lohitashwa as Kaaka Mani
 Sriman as Sekar
 John Vijay as Shanmugam
 Chaya Singh as Raja's sister 
 Dhilip Subbarayan as Saravanan
 Prinz Nithik
 Chef Damodharan
 Sendrayan as Kadappan
 Muthuraman
 Munnar Ramesh
 Mippu
 S R Pandiyan as Gangster

Production
Following the huge success of Tamil film, Thirudan Police (2014), producer Selvakumar decided to bring together director Caarthick Raju and Dinesh for a further film together. The project was first announced in December 2014, and the shoot starts around August, 2015

The film was predominantly shot around Muttom in Nagercoil, Tamil Nadu and completed within 45 days. The film completed production in November 2015, and it was revealed that Selvakumar would first wait for the release of his other venture with Dinesh, Oru Naal Koothu, to release, before drafting release plans for Ulkuthu.

Music 
There are a total of three songs in this movie, composed by Justin Prabhakaran.

Reception

References

External links
 

2017 films
Indian action comedy-drama films
Films scored by Justin Prabhakaran
2010s Tamil-language films
2010s action comedy-drama films
2017 masala films
Films directed by Caarthick Raju